Mimi Pond is an American cartoonist, comics artist, illustrator, humorist, and writer.

Career and awards 
Pond spent much of the ‘80s and ‘90s writing for television, magazines, and creating cartoons and comic strips for both mediums.

She briefly worked on The Simpsons, writing the first full-length broadcast episode, "Simpsons Roasting on an Open Fire" in 1989, which was nominated for two Emmy awards. Pond, however, did not become a regular member of the writing team, and she alleged it was because the showrunner at the time did not want a woman on the team.  She is primarily a cartoonist and illustrator and she got her first big break as a weekly cartoonist with Spectator Magazine. Some of her other early work during the 1980s included creating for publications such as, the National Lampoon, The Village Voice, The New York Times, Adweek, and others. She is the author and illustrator of five humor books and currently contributes to the Los Angeles Times. She won the PEN Center USA award for Graphic Literature Outstanding Body of Work, with a special mention for her 2014 graphic novel, Over Easy, for Canadian publisher Drawn & Quarterly. Pond also won an Inkpot Award in 2014 at the San Diego Comic-Con, after the release of Over Easy.

Pond has written for Designing Women on CBS and Pee-Wee's Playhouse, as well as being a cartoonist for the Los Angeles Times and other publications. She also wrote a long-running full page comic for Seventeen magazine from the 1980s – 1990s.

Following her book Shoes Never Lie, the Boston Globe described her as "perhaps the leading authority on the spiritual, emotional and visceral connection between women and shoes" (for a story on the shoe collection of Imelda Marcos).

Graphic memoirs 
She has written two graphic memoirs, Over Easy and The Customer is Always Wrong. The two memoirs are loosely based on Pond's own life and sequentially work together as one large story arc. The subject matter is primarily focused on her time as a waitress in Oakland, trying to become a full-time artist after her studies.

Over Easy 
Pond spent over 15 years working on the graphic narrative; the idea had been sitting with her since her time as a waitress in an Oakland, California restaurant during the 1970s. Over Easy is a coming of age story about a young Margaret Pond as she works at Imperial Café, a diner full of hippies and punks in the late 70s. It is in this diner that Margaret makes the transition into 'Madge' and gets a glimpse at adulthood, which includes addiction, confusion, awkward moments, the artist dream, and sexual awakenings. Over Easy encapsulates 1970s Oakland in a witty, slightly fictionalized, memoir of Pond's experiences. The memoir also gained a significant amount of praise from journals and news publications such as, USA Today, The Comics Journal, NPR, Publishers Weekly, The National Post and more.

The Customer Is Always Wrong 
In 2017, Pond released her second graphic memoir and continuation of the narrative in Over Easy. Madge is still working at the vibrant Imperial Café in Oakland, is surrounded by similar misfits in the restaurant, and still has the dream to become an artist. In The Customer Is Always Wrong, Madge finally makes the decision to save up enough money to get out of the West coast and head East to New York where she could pursue her art full-time. The second novel also has a darker tone to it compared to the first part of the story, making the subject matter difficult for Pond to relive as she created the story. The Customer Is Always Wrong was well received by fans, similar to the first memoir. It gained praise from publications and groups such as PEN America, Entertainment Weekly, Vulture and more.

Personal life 
Pond is married to cartoonist and artist Wayne White. They have two children together, Woodrow and Lulu White, who are both artists.

In the 1970s, Pond worked at Mama's Royal Café, which became the inspiration for her graphic memoirs.

Education 
In the 1970s, Pond attended the California College of the Arts (CCA) for an art degree.

Bibliography

References

External links
 
 
 Lambiek Comiclopedia article

Living people
Year of birth missing (living people)
American women cartoonists
American women television writers
American television writers
American comics writers
American female comics artists
Female comics writers
American comedy writers
American humorists
20th-century American women writers
21st-century American women writers
20th-century American women artists
21st-century American women artists
Women humorists
American cartoonists
Inkpot Award winners